The following outline is provided as an overview of and topical guide to Hinduism:

Hinduism – predominant and indigenous religious tradition of the Indian Subcontinent. Hinduism has no single founder, and is formed of diverse traditions, including a wide spectrum of laws and prescriptions of "daily morality" based on the notion of karma, dharma, and societal norms. Among its direct roots is the  historical Vedic religion of Iron Age India and, as such, Hinduism is often called the "oldest living religion" or the "oldest living major religion" in the world.

General reference 

 Pronunciation: 
 IPA: 
 Common English name: Hinduism
 Adherent(s): Hindus
 Sacred language: Sanskrit
 Sacred sign: Om (ॐ)

History 

 History of Hinduism in Pakistan
 History of Hinduism in Southeast Asia
 History of Hinduism in Afghanistan
 History of Hinduism in China
 History of Hinduism in the Philippines

Prehistoric 
 Indus Valley civilisation
 Dravidian folk religion

Vedic history 

 Historical Vedic religion
 Vedic Sanskrit
 Iron Age in India
 Proto-Indo-Europeans
 Proto-Indo-European religion
 Proto-Indo-Iranian religion
 Indo-Aryan migrations

Denomination

Vaishnavism 

 Manipuri Vaishnavism
 Bhagavatism
 Vaikhanasas
 Pancharatra
 Thenkalais
 Vadakalais
 Munitraya
 Krishnaism
 Jagannathism
 Warkari
 Mahanubhava
 Haridasa
 Sahajiya
 Baul
 Pushtimarg
 Ekasarana
 Gaudiya
 Radha-vallabha
 Ramanandi
 Kapadi
 Balmiki
 Kabir panth
 Dadu panth
 Pranami
 Swaminarayan
 Ramsnehi
 Mahanam

Shaivism

 History of Shaivism
 Kashmir Shaivism
 Shiva
 Sadasiva
 Bhairava
 Rudra
 Virabhadra

 Shakti
 Parvati
 Sati
 Durga
 Kali

 Ganesha
 Kartikeya
 Sastha
 Shiva forms
 Others
 Agamas and Tantras
 Shivasutras
 Tirumurai
 Vachanas

 Pati
 Pashu
 Pasam

Three bondages

 Karma
 Maya 
 36 Tattvas
 Yoga
 Satkaryavada
 Abhasavada
 Svatantrya
 Aham
 Samariscus
 Vibhuti
 Rudraksha
 Panchakshara
 Bilva
 Maha Shivaratri
 Yamas-Niyamas
 Guru-Linga-Jangam
 Philosophies and Schools
 Adi Margam
 Pashupata
 Kalamukha
 Kapalika
 Mantra Margam  Saiddhantika
 Siddhantism  Non - Saiddhantika
 Kashmir Shaivism
 Pratyabhijna
 Vama
 Dakshina
 Kaula: Trika-Yamala-Kubjika-Netra
 Others
 Nath
 Inchegeri
 Veerashaiva/Lingayatism
 Siddharism
 Sroutaism
 Aghori
 Indonesian

Newer movements 

 Advait Mat
 Divine Light Mission
 American Meditation Institute
 Ananda (Ananda Yoga)
 Ananda Ashrama
 Ananda Marga
 Art of Living Foundation
 Arya Samaj
 Ayyavazhi
 Brahma Kumaris
 Brahmoism (Brahmo Samaj)
 Adi Dharm
 Sadharan Brahmo Samaj
 Chinmaya Mission
 Datta Yoga
 Divine Life Society
 Hanuman Foundation
 Himalayan Institute of Yoga Science and Philosophy
 Advaita Vedanta
 Akshar-Purushottam Darshan
 Bhedabheda
 Achintya Bheda Abheda
 Dvaitadvaita
 Dvaita Vedanta
 Integral yoga
 Pratyabhijna
 Shaiva Siddhanta
 Shiva Advaita
 Shuddhadvaita
 Vishishtadvaita

Practices

Festivals 

 Diwali
 Holi
 Shivaratri
 Raksha Bandhan
 Navaratri
 Durga Puja
 Ramlila
 Vijayadashami
 Ganesh Chaturthi
 Rama Navami
 Janmashtami
 Onam
 Pongal
 Makar Sankranti
 New Year
 Bihu
 Gudi Padwa
 Pahela Baishakh
 Puthandu
 Vaisakhi
 Vishu
 Ugadi
 Kumbh Mela
 Haridwar
 Nashik
 Prayag
 Ujjain

 Ratha Yatra
 Teej
 Vasant Panchami

Philosophy

 Bhakti
 Krishnaism
 Supreme Personality of Godhead
 Japa
 Yoga
 Meditation
 Hare Krishna
 Mantras
 Puja
 Arati
 Bhajan
 Kirtan
 Sattvic diet
 Ahimsa
 Rishis
 Tilaka
 Guru
 Diksha
 Dashavatara
 Matsya
 Kurma
 Varaha
 Krishna
 Balarama
 Rama
 Narasimha
 Vamana
 Buddha
 Parashurama
 Kalki
 Dhanvantari
 Kapila
 Pancha-tattva
 Chaitanya
 Nityananda
 Advaita Acharya
 Gadadhara Pandita
 Srivasa Thakura

Politics 
 Hindu studies
 Hindutva
 Hindu nationalism

Hindu groups and political parties 

 Bharatiya Janata Party
 Shiv Sena
 All Jammu and Kashmir Praja Parishad
 Asom Bharatiya Janata Party
 Maharashtra Navnirman Sena
 Hindu Munnani
 Hindu Dharma Samudaya of Bhutan
 Maharashtrawadi Gomantak Party
 Hindu Makkal Katchi
 Dr. Syamaprasad Jana Jagaran Manch
 Bharath Dharma Jana Sena
 Hindu Mahasabha
 Hindu Mahajana Sangam
 Hindu Samhati
 Shivsena Nepal
 Rastriya Prajatantra Party Nepal
 Rastriya Prajatantra Party
 Hindu Prajatantrik Party
 Siva Senai
 Banga Sena
 Swadhin Bangabhumi Andolan
 Pakistan Hindu Party
 Progressive Reform Party (Suriname)
 HINDRAF
 Malaysia Makkal Sakti Party
 Malaysian Ceylonese Congress
 Malaysian Advancement Party
 Minority Rights Action Party
 Sangh Parivar
 Vishva Hindu Parishad
 Rashtriya Swayamsevak Sangh
 Akhil Bharatiya Vidyarthi Parishad
 Bharatiya Mazdoor Sangh
 Bharatiya Kisan Sangh
 Bajrang Dal
 Hindu Swayamsevak Sangh
 Akhil Bharatiya Adhivakta Parishad
 Swadeshi Jagaran Manch
 Deen Dayal Shodh Sansthan
 Bharat Vikas Parishad
 Sabarimala Ayyappa Seva Samajam
 Seva Bharati
 Hindu Aikya Vedi
 Ekal Vidyalaya
 Saraswati Shishu Mandir
 Vidya Bharati Akhil Bharatiya Shiksha Sansthan
 Vanavasi Kalyan Ashram
 Friends of Tribals Society
 Akhil Bharatiya Itihas Sankalan Yojana
 India Development and Relief Fund

Organisations
 Survey of Hindu organisations
 ISKCON
 Swaminarayan Sampraday
 Bochasanwasi Shri Akshar Purushottam Swaminarayan Sanstha
 Arya Samaj
 Ramakrishna Mission
 Sringeri Sharada Peetham
 Banga Mahila Vidyalaya
 Gaudiya Math
 Hindu Maha Sabha (Fiji)
 Manav Dharma Sabha
 Paramahansa Mandali
 Prarthana Samaj
 Ratnagiri Hindu Sabha
 Satyashodhak Samaj
 Tattwabodhini Sabha
 Theosophical Society of the Arya Samaj
 Trust deed of Brahmo Sabha

Hindu Sewa Parishad
 Sri Trimurtidham Balaji Hanuman Mandir
 Saiva Siddhanta Church
 Sanatan Dharma Maha Sabha 
 Sanatan Sanstha
 Santhigiri Ashram
 Sathya Sai Organization
 Satsang (Deoghar)
 Science of Identity Foundation
 Science of Spirituality (a.k.a. Sawan Kirpal Ruhani Mission)
 Self-Realization Fellowship
 Yogoda Satsanga Society of India
 Shree Shree Anandamayee Sangha
 Siddha Yoga Dham Associates Foundation
 Sivananda Yoga Vedanta Centres
 Society of Abidance in Truth
 Sree Narayana Dharma Paripalana Yogam
 Alwaye Advaita Ashram
 Sree Narayana Trust
 List of Sree Narayana Institutions
 Sri Aurobindo Ashram
 Auroville Foundation
 Sri Aurobindo Ashram, Rewa
 Sri Aurobindo International School, Hyderabad
 Sri Chinmoy Centres
 Sri Ramana Ashram
 Sri Sri Radha Govindaji Trust
 Sringeri Sharada Peetham
 Swadhyay Parivar
 Swaminarayan Mandir Vasna Sanstha
 Vishwa Madhwa Maha Parishat
 Vishwa Nirmala Dharma

Hindu texts 

 Shruti
 Smriti

Vedas 

 Rigveda
 Samaveda
 Yajurveda
 Atharvaveda
 Samhita
 Brahmana
 Aranyaka
 Upanishads

Upanishads

108 Upanishads 

 The 108 Upanishads
 Isha
 Kena
 Katha
 Prashna
 Mundaka
 Mandukya
 Taittiriya
 Aitareya
 Chandogya
 Brihadaranyaka
 Brahma
 Kaivalya
 Jabala
 Shvetashvatara
 Hamsa
 Aruneya
 Garbha
 Narayana
 Paramahamsa
 Amritabindu
 Amritanada
 Atharvashiras
 Atharvashikha
 Maitrayaniya
 Kaushitaki
 Brihajjabala
 Nrisimha Tapaniya
 Kalagni Rudra
 Maitreya
 Subala
 Kshurika
 Mantrika
 Sarvasara
 Niralamba
 Shukarahasya
 Vajrasuchi
 Tejobindu
 Nadabindu
 Dhyanabindu
 Brahmavidya
 Yogatattva
 Atmabodha
 Naradaparivrajaka
 Trishikhi-brahmana
 Sita
 Yogachudamani
 Nirvana
 Mandala-brahmana
 Dakshinamurti
 Sharabha
 Skanda
 Mahanarayana
 Advayataraka
 Rama Rahasya
 Ramatapaniya
 Vasudeva
 Mudgala
 Shandilya
 Paingala
 Bhikshuka
 Maha
 Sariraka
 Yogashikha
 Turiyatita
 Sannyasa
 Paramahamsaparivrajaka
 Akshamalika
 Avyakta
 Ekakshara
 Annapurna
 Surya
 Akshi
 Adhyatma
 Kundika
 Savitri
 Atma
 Pashupatabrahma
 Parabrahma
 Avadhuta
 Tripuratapini
 Devi
 Tripura
 Kathashruti
 Bhavana
 Rudrahridaya
 Yoga-Kundalini
 Bhasma
 Rudraksha
 Ganapati
 Darshana
 Tarasara
 Mahavakya
 Pancabrahma
 Pranagnihotra
 Gopala-Tapani
 Krishna
 Yajnavalkya
 Varaha
 Shatyayaniya
 Hayagriva
 Dattatreya
 Garuda
 Kali-Santarana
 Jabali
 Saubhagyalakshmi
 Sarasvati-rahasya
 Bahvricha
 Muktikā

Rig Vedic 

 Aitareya
 Kaushitaki

Sama Vedic 

 Chandogya
 Kena

Yajur Vedic 

 Brihadaranyaka
 Isha
 Taittiriya
 Katha
 Shvetashvatara
 Maitri

Atharava Vedic 

 Mundaka
 Mandukya
 Prashna

Vedangas 

 Shiksha
 Chandas
 Vyakarana
 Nirukta
 Kalpa
 Jyotisha

Puranas

Brahma Puranas 

 Brahma
 Brahmānda
 Brahmavaivarta
 Markandeya
 Bhavishya

Vaishnava Puranas 

 Vishnu
 Bhagavata
 Naradiya
 Garuda
 Padma
 Vamana
 Varaha Purana
 Kurma
 Matsya

Shaiva Puranas 

 Shiva
 Linga
 Skanda
 Vayu
 Agni

Shastras and Sutras 

 Dharma Shastra
 Artha Shastra
 Kamasutra
 Brahma Sutras
 Samkhya Sutras
 Mimamsa Sutras
 Nyāya Sūtras
 Vaiśeṣika Sūtra
 Yoga Sutras
 Pramana Sutras
 Charaka Samhita
 Sushruta Samhita
 Natya Shastra
 Vastu Shastra
 Panchatantra
 Divya Prabandha
 Tirumurai
 Ramcharitmanas
 Yoga Vasistha
 Swara yoga
 Shiva Samhita
 Gheranda Samhita
 Panchadasi
 Vedantasara
 Stotra

Literary texts 

 Ramayana
 Mahabharata
 Bhagavad Gita

Hindu people 
 List of Hindus
 List of Hindu gurus

Freedom fighters
 Pazhassi Raja
 Mangal Pandey
 Chandrashekhar Azad
 Subhas Chandra Bose
 Bankim Chandra Chatterjee
 Veer Savarkar
 Lokmanya Tilak

Social leaders
 K.B. Hedgewar
 Madhav Sadashiv Golwalkar
 K.S. Sudarshan
 Pravin Togadia
 Shanta Kumar

Politicians 
 Mahatma Gandhi
 Jawaharlal Nehru
 Vallabhbhai Patel
 Lal Bahadur Shastri
 Rajiv Gandhi
 Indira Gandhi
 Atal Bihari Vajpayee
 Lal Krishna Advani
 Balasaheb Thackeray
 Yogi Adityanath
 Govindacharya
 Narendra Modi
 Uma Bharti
 Himanta Biswa Sarma
 Rajnath Singh

Other terms and concepts 
 Maya (illusion)
 Itihasa
 Karma in Hinduism
 Kosas
 Sri
 Shakti
 Purusha
 Gayatri
 Vac

Inter-religious 

 Hinduism and Buddhism
 Gautama Buddha in Hinduism
 Theravada
 Hinduism and Jainism
 Rama in Jainism
 Salakapurusa
 Hinduism and Sikhism
 Rama in Sikhism
 Dasam Granth
 Hinduism and Islam
 Hindu-Muslim riots
 Hindu–Muslim unity
 Ganga-Jamuni tehzeeb
 Hinduism and Christianity

Further reading

References

External links 

 

Hinduism
Hinduism
Hinduism
Hinduism-related lists